The Corioxenidae are an insect family of the order Strepsiptera. Species in this family are parasites of heteropteran bugs including the Pentatomidae, Scutelleridae, Cydnidae, Coreidae, and Lygaeidae. The males lack mandibles. Three subfamilies within this family are recognized. The subfamilies are separated using morphology of the males, particularly on the basis of the number of tarsi and the presence of tarsal claws.

Corioxeninae Kinzelbach, 1970 
Corioxenos Blair, 1936    
Floridoxenos Kathirithamby and Peck, 1994    
Loania Kinzelbach, 1970    
Perissozocera Johnson, 1976
Australoxenos Kathirithamby, 1990
Blissoxenos Miyamoto & Kifune, 1984
Malayaxenos Kifune, 1981
Mufagaa Kinzelbach, 1980
Viridipromontorius Luna de Carvalho, 1985
Triozocerinae Kinzelbach, 1970
Triozocera Pierce, 1909
Dundoxenos Luna de Carvalho, 1956
Uniclavinae Kathirithamby, 1989
 Uniclavus Kathirithamby, 1989
 Proceroxenos Pohl, Katbeh-Bader & Schneider, 1996

References

Strepsiptera
Insect families